Stone, Carpenter & Sheldon was an American architectural firm based in Providence, Rhode Island. Established in 1906 and dissolved in 1926, it was the successor firm to Stone, Carpenter & Willson.

History
The firm of Stone, Carpenter & Sheldon was organized in 1906 as the partnership of architects Alfred Stone (1834-1908), Charles E. Carpenter (1845-1923), and Walter G. Sheldon (1855-1931). Sheldon, who had become a partner in the earlier firm in 1901, replaced Edmund R. Willson as the named third partner. Sheldon had been a significant designer within the firm, and took on those responsibilities. In 1908 Stone died, and Carpenter retired, leaving Sheldon as the only principal in the firm. By 1919 Sheldon was joined in partnership by his son, Gilbert Sheldon, and William C. Mustard. Due to declining health Sheldon retired in 1926, and the firm was dissolved.

In its early years, the firm retained some of the prestige of its predecessor, though this was mostly lost by the time of World War I. Their practice was mostly domestic, and they were responsible for alterations of several works by their predecessor firms. Many of their works, in Providence, Pawtucket and elsewhere, contribute to historic districts that have been listed on the United States National Register of Historic Places.

Works
 1906 - Freeman Cocroft House (Croftmere), 570 Post Rd, South Kingstown, Rhode Island
 1908 - Carter Day Nursery, 295 Pine St, Providence, Rhode Island
 Demolished.
 1908 - Edward S. Macomber House, 134 Blackstone Blvd, Providence, Rhode Island
 1908 - Charles H. Merriman House, 37 Cooke St, Providence, Rhode Island
 1911 - Lena C. Martin House, 290 Blackstone Blvd, Providence, Rhode Island
 1914 - Joseph Ott House (Remodeling), 97 Walcott St, Pawtucket, Rhode Island
 1914 - Charles H. Warren House, 1030 Pleasant St, Worcester, Massachusetts
 1915 - Walter S. Ingraham House, 149 President Ave, Providence, Rhode Island
 1915 - Palmer Block, 100 Fountain St, Providence, Rhode Island
 Stone, Carpenter & Sheldon added four more stories in 1916–17.
 1916 - John Howland School, 120 Cole Ave, Providence, Rhode Island
 Demolished.
 1916 - Industrial Trust Branch, 14 High St, Westerly, Rhode Island
 1916 - Newport Art Museum, 76 Bellevue Ave, Newport, Rhode Island
 Alterations to the John N. A. Griswold House to create studios and galleries for the museum.
 1917 - Dormitory, Rhode Island School for the Deaf, 520 Hope St, Providence, Rhode Island
 1918 - Union Trust Building (Addition), 170 Westminster St, Providence, Rhode Island
 1921 - Joseph Ott House, 290 Ocean Rd, Narragansett Pier, Rhode Island

References

Architecture firms based in Rhode Island
Companies based in Providence, Rhode Island